Afag Bashirgyzy, born Afag Bashir gyzy oghlu Safarova (1955, Baku), is an Azerbaijani actress.

Life and career
Afag Bashirgyzy was born in 1955 to the family of a renowned Azerbaijani comedian, Bashir Safaroglu. In 1974 - 1979, she studied at the Cultural Education faculty of Azerbaijan State University of Culture and Arts. She started her acting career in 1973 at the Lenkoran State Drama Theater, soon gaining a reputation of a talented actress. In 1975, she moved to Sumgait to work at the Sumgait Drama Theater. Starring mainly in comedies, Afaq Bashirgyzy was listed as one of the top Azerbaijani comedian actresses. One of her best performances was in the role of Söylü, a wife of an unsuccessful poet and pregnant mother of six children, in the film The Engagement Ring.

In 1989, she began working at Azerbaijan Drama Theatre and performed in main roles in Subaylarınızdan görəsiniz (Have bachelors), O olmasın, bu olsun (If Not That One, Then This One), Bankir adaxlı (Banker boyfriend), Məhəbbət oyunu (The Love Game), İtgin gəlin (The lost bride), Məsmə xala dayımdır (Aunt Mesme is my uncle), etc. She also starred in Azerbaijani films Bəxt üzüyü (The Engagement Ring), Yaşıl eynəkli Adam (The man in green eyeglasses), Nekroloq (The Necrolog).

Currently, Bashirgyzy teaches acting at the Azerbaijan State University of Culture and Arts. In 2009, she opened Bashir Safaroglu Theater in Moscow, naming it after her late father.

Afag Bashirgyzy is married with one son.

Awards
Merited Actress, 1989
People's Artist, 1993
Qızıl Dərviş (Golden Dervish), 1993, 2003
Presidential Award, 2010
Best of the best, 2011

References

External links

Azerbaijani film actresses
Azerbaijani stage actresses
Azerbaijani theatre directors
1955 births
Actors from Baku
People's Artists of Azerbaijan
Soviet Azerbaijani people
Living people